Larry Hayes may refer to:

 Larry Livermore (Lawrence Hayes, born 1947), American musician, record producer, music journalist and author
 Larry Hayes (American football) (1935–2017), American football player
 Larry Allen Hayes (1948–2003), American spree killer